The French submarine Lagrange (Q112) was a Lagrange-class submarine built for the French Navy built between 1913 and 1918. It was laid down in the Arsenal de Toulon shipyards and launched on August 12, 1919. Lagrange was completed in 1918 but saw no action during World War I and served in the French Marine Nationale until 1935.

Design
The Lagrange class submarines were constructed as part of the French fleet's expansion programmes from 1913 to 1914. During construction, though, the idea was abandoned and the ships were instead equipped with diesel engines.

Propulsion while surfaced was provided by two  diesel motors built by the Swiss manufacturer Sulzer and two  electric motors.

The ships were equipped with eight 450 mm torpedo tubes (four in the bow, two stern and two external), with a total of 10 torpedoes and two on-board guns. The class was also armed with a 75 mm with an ammo supply of 440 shells. The crew of one ship consisted of four officers and 43 of officers and seamen.

Service history
Lagrange was built in the Arsenal de Toulon. It was laid down in 1913, launched on 31 May 1917, and completed in 1921. It was named in honor of the distinguished French eighteenth-century mathematician Joseph-Louis Lagrange. From 1922 to 1923, Lagrange underwent a major refit in which it received a new conning tower, bridge and periscope. Lagrange served in the Mediterranean Sea until 1935.

References

Citations 

 

World War I submarines of France
Lagrange-class submarines
1917 ships